KMCL (1240 AM) was a radio station formerly broadcasting an Adult Contemporary format. Located in Donnelly, Idaho, United States, the station was owned by Brundage Mountain Air Inc.

History
The station was assigned the call letters KZID on 1987-06-01. On 1992-02-10, the station changed its call sign to KMCL.

On October 9, 2009, the station turned in its license to the Federal Communications Commission. The license was cancelled and the call sign deleted from the FCC's database.

References

MCL
Mainstream adult contemporary radio stations in the United States
Radio stations disestablished in 2009
Defunct radio stations in the United States
2009 disestablishments in Idaho
MCL